Yekaterininskoye is a rural locality (a selo) and the administrative center of Yekaterininsky Selsoviet, Tretyakovsky District, Altai Krai, Russia. The population was 1,111 as of 2013. There are 10 streets.

Geography 
Yekaterininskoye is located 18 km south of Staroaleyskoye (the district's administrative centre) by road, on the Aley River. Lopatinka is the nearest rural locality.

References 

Rural localities in Tretyakovsky District